Kang Kang (1970–1980) was a male giant panda born in China in 1970. Along with Lan Lan, they were the first pair of giant pandas at the Ueno Zoo, gifted to Japan by China after the normalization of relations between the two countries.

Kang Kang and Lan Lan caused an immediate sensation when they arrived in Japan. Subsequently, a so-called "panda boom" occurred in the country. In 1974, this pair of giant pandas attracted 7.64 million visitors.

Kang Kang and Lan Lan failed to give birth to babies. In January 1980, another female giant panda, Huan Huan, came to Japan from China to be Kang Kang's second "bride". However, he died suddenly of a summer cold after just six months.

See also
 Lan Lan
 Panda diplomacy

References

1970 animal births
1980 animal deaths
Individual giant pandas
Individual animals in Japan